"The Straight Life" is a 1968 song written and originally recorded by Sonny Curtis.  It was made into a Top 40 hit by Bobby Goldsboro later that year. 

Curtis' version is a track from his album, The Sonny Curtis Style.  It reached number 45 on the U.S. Country chart.  Goldsboro's is from his album, Word Pictures.  It reached number 36 on the U.S. Billboard Hot 100 and number six on the Adult Contemporary chart. It also became a hit in Canada (#19).

Chart history (Bobby Goldsboro version)

Weekly charts

Cover versions
 "The Straight Life" was recorded by Glen Campbell on his 1968 LP, Wichita Lineman.  
 Bing Crosby included the song on his 1969 album, Hey Jude/Hey Bing!.
 Alternative comedian Neil Hamburger recorded a cover version of the song for his 2019 album Still Dwelling.

References

External links
 Lyrics of this song
  (Bobby Goldsboro)
  (Glen Campbell)

1968 songs
Bobby Goldsboro songs
Songs written by Sonny Curtis
1968 singles
United Artists Records singles
Song recordings produced by Bob Montgomery (songwriter)
Glen Campbell songs